Polar AC is a compilation album by jazz trumpeter Freddie Hubbard. It was his final album released on Creed Taylor's CTI label and features performances by Hubbard, Hubert Laws, George Benson, Junior Cook, and Ron Carter. It was put together by CTI after Hubbard left the label to go to Columbia, and the tracks were recorded at different sessions, between 1971 and 1973. The album featured pieces: "People Make the World Go Round" and "Betcha, By Golly Wow", recorded both on April 12, 1972, and "Son of Sky Dive" recorded around 1973. "Polar AC" (aka "Fantasy in D" and "Ugetsu") came from First Light sessions, whilst "Naturally" was recorded during Sky Dive sessions, and both can be found on CD reissues of their respective albums.

Track listing
 "Polar AC" (Cedar Walton) - 6:56
 "People Make the World Go Round" (Thom Bell, Linda Creed) - 5:54
 "Betcha by Golly, Wow" (Thom Bell, Linda Creed) - 8:14
 "Naturally" (Nat Adderley) - 5:55
 "Son of Sky Dive" (Freddie Hubbard) - 13:21

Personnel
Freddie Hubbard: trumpet
Junior Cook: tenor saxophone
Hubert Laws: flute
George Cables: piano (tracks 2 & 5)
George Benson: guitar
Ron Carter: bass
Jack DeJohnette: drums (track 1)
Lenny White: drums (tracks 2 & 5)
Billy Cobham: drums (track 4)
Airto Moreira: percussion (tracks 2 & 3)
Strings (tracks 1-3): Al Brown, Paul Gershman, Emanuel "Manny" Green, Max Ellen, Theodore Israel, Harold Kohon, Charles Libove, Harry Lookofsky, Joe Malin, Charles McCracken, David Nadien, Gene Orloff, Matthew Raimondi, George Ricci, Tony Sophos, Tosha Samaroff, Irving Spice, Manny Vardi
Woodwinds (track 4): Phil Bodner, Wally Kane, George Marge, Romeo Penque
Brass (track 4): Wayne Andre, Garnett Brown, Paul Faulise, Tony Price, Alan Rubin, Marvin Stamm
Don Sebesky: string arrangements (track 1), brass and woodwind arrangements (track 4)
Bob James: string arrangements (tracks 2 & 3)

References

Freddie Hubbard albums
1975 albums
Albums arranged by Don Sebesky
Albums produced by Creed Taylor
CTI Records albums